Grassroots Shakespeare London is a British theatre company based in London, UK. The company specialises in producing accessible works of William Shakespeare inspired by using Elizabethan original theatre practices.

Company history 
Grassroots Shakespeare London was established in London in 2011.

The company's first production was A Midsummer Night's Dream, which performed in Hyde Park and Victoria Embankment Gardens. In December 2011, they performed The Merry Wives of Windsor at the New Red Lion Theatre and in 2012, they launched the theatre festival at The Scoop at More London with Much Ado About Nothing during HM The Queen's Diamond Jubilee celebrations. This production also played at the Dell Theatre, Royal Shakespeare Company as part of the World Shakespeare Festival 2012.

In August 2012 they devised a new production of Much Ado About Nothing for their summer residency at Victoria Embankment Gardens and were nominated by the Off West End Theatre Awards for Best Ensemble and Best Production. They also received recommendations from London newspaper The Evening Standard  and Time Out.

In December 2012 to January 2013, the company performed a repertory season of A Midsummer Night's Dream and The Tempest. In 2013, the company presented a 'Summer of Love' repertory season of Love's Labour's Lost and Romeo and Juliet in Islington at the Old Red Lion Theatre.

In 2014 a sold out production of Othello was presented at the Leicester Square Theatre starring BBC actor James Alexandrou as Iago and Ian Charleson Award nominee Nari Blair-Mangat as Othello. They were the only company to be performing Shakespeare in London's West End for the 450th birthday celebrations, which also saw them perform with actor Damian Lewis at London's Guildhall. Rehearsals were recorded by BBC World Service and James Alexandrou's performance as Iago featured in their programme The Why Factor.

In 2016 the company was announced as the first ever resident theatre company at Leicester Square Theatre in London's West End. As part of Shakespeare 400, Grassroots performed Twelfth Night, starring Ellie Nunn as Viola and John Pickard as Sir Toby Belch throughout April - May 2016. They additionally produced a 14-hour live 'Dawn til Dusk' broadcast in association with the live-streaming app Periscope, Twitter and GoPro, which saw the company gain over 700,000 views on Twitter alone. In May 2016, the company performed speeches with Simon Russell Beale at Guildhall and subsequently viewed the 1623 First Folio, held at Guildhall Library, one of the top 5 quality editions left remaining in the world.

The company's Artistic Director and Executive Producer is Siobhán Daly.

Notes and references

References

Sources

External links
Grassroots Shakespeare London

Shakespearean theatre companies
Theatre companies in London
Theatre companies in England
West End theatre
Leicester Square